Big Brothers Big Sisters of America is a 501(c)(3) non-profit organization whose mission is to "create and support one-to-one mentoring relationships that ignite the power and promise of youth". Adult volunteers are matched with children from age 5 to young adulthood. It was founded by Irvin Ferdinand Westheimer.

Big Brothers Big Sisters is one of the oldest and largest youth mentoring organizations in the United States. Big Brothers Big Sisters mentors children, ages 5 through young adulthood in communities across the country. The ages of children and youth served varies by affiliate.

Congressional charter
The group holds a congressional charter under Title 36 of the United States Code.

Impact
Public/Private Ventures, an independent Philadelphia-based national research organization, conducted a study from 1994 to 1995, monitoring 950 boys and girls nationwide to study the effects of Big Brothers Big Sisters. CEO Karen J. Mathis reported that the study found favorable outcomes to the organization.

Public/Private Ventures conducted another study in 2011 that evaluated the school-based Big Brothers Big Sisters Program. This program also found favorable outcomes.

History
In 1904, a young New York City court clerk named Ernest Kent Coulter was seeing many boys come through his courtroom. He recognized that caring adults could help many of these boys stay out of trouble, and he set out to find volunteers. That marked the beginning of Big Brothers Big Sisters of New York City and the Big Brothers movement. By 1916, Big Brothers had spread to 96 cities across the country.

At around the same time, the members of a group called Ladies of Charity were befriending girls who had come through the New York Children's Court. That group would later become Catholic Big Sisters, an independent organization.

In 1958, the Big Brothers Association was granted a Congressional charter. Big Sisters International was founded in 1970. Both groups continued to work independently until 1977, when Big Brothers of America and Big Sisters International joined forces and became Big Brothers Big Sisters of America.

Big Brothers Big Sisters received the American Institute of Philanthropy's highest rating, an A+. In 2011, Philanthropedia listed BBBS as the #1 Nonprofit for At-Risk Youth.

In 2013 Big Brothers Big Sisters of America (BBBSA) found itself at the center of a scandal involving grant funding, which led to sweeping changes at the organization. On June 24, 2013, the United States Department of Justice issued an Audit Report stating it was freezing the disbursement of all grant funds to BBBSA, noting that the organization was "in material non-compliance with the majority of the grant requirements" that were tested by the audit. "As a result of these weaknesses," the audit noted, the agency "questioned $19,462,448 in funding that the grantee has received and recommended the $3,714,838 in funds not yet disbursed be put to better use".  The audit further stated that "most significantly", it "found that BBBSA's practices for recording and supporting grant-related expenditures were inadequate to safeguard grant funds and ensure compliance with the terms and conditions of the grants".

In the wake of the 2013 audit, Big Brothers replaced its management team and implemented policies governing the use of federal grant funds to bring the organization back into compliance. As part of a settlement with the Justice Department, BBBSA paid $1.6 million and agreed to institute a strict compliance program that requires the organization to engage in regular audits, establish a compliance team, an employee code of conduct, whistleblower policies and a disciplinary policy for employees who engage in or fail to disclose abuses of federal grant funds. The organization also provides regular employee training on these policies and employs risk assessment tools to detect abuses that might otherwise go undetected.

The claims resolved by this settlement are allegations only; there has been no determination of liability. BBBSA and many of its affiliates remain partnered with OJJDP today.

References

External links
 
 BBBS International
 BBBS Partnership with African American Fraternities – mentoringbrothers.org
 Charity Navigator
 Foundation Guide
 Exchange program with Spain

Mentorships
AmeriCorps organizations
Child-related organizations in the United States
Charities based in Florida
Organizations established in 1904
Educational charities based in the United States
Patriotic and national organizations chartered by the United States Congress
1904 establishments in New York City
Youth organizations established in 1904